Love for Levon: Benefit To Save The Barn was a benefit concert held on October 3, 2012 at the Izod Center in East Rutherford, New Jersey. The concert was a tribute to the life of The Band's co-lead vocalist and drummer Levon Helm, who died of throat cancer on April 19, 2012. The concert featured a wide variety of musicians who had worked with Helm as well as musicians who were influenced by him. Proceeds from the concert went towards keeping Helm's Woodstock barn in his family's control as well as continuing his Midnight Ramble concert series in the barn. The concert's musical directors were Don Was and Helm's frequent collaborator Larry Campbell. The concert was released on CD and DVD on March 19, 2013.

Album and video

The concert was released as a two-disc album on CD, and also as a two-disc video on DVD and Blu-ray, on March 19, 2013.

Musicians

House bands
There were two separate house bands for the performance which shared many of the same members. One band was The Levon Helm Band and the other was The All Star Band. The horn section backed both bands for most songs. Some songs included only some members of either band, and My Morning Jacket performed their songs with only the assistance of the horn section.

The All Star Band
Larry Campbell – acoustic and electric guitar, mandolin, fiddle, lead and backing vocals
Amy Helm – lead and backing vocals
Teresa Williams – lead and backing vocals
Greg Leisz – acoustic and electric guitar
Kenny Aronoff – drums
Don Was – bass guitar, double bass
Brian Mitchell – piano, organ, accordion, keyboards

The Levon Helm Band
Larry Campbell – acoustic and electric guitar, mandolin, fiddle, lead and backing vocals
Amy Helm – lead and backing vocals
Teresa Williams – lead and backing vocals
Jim Weider – acoustic and electric guitar
Justin Guip – drums
Byron Isaacs – bass guitar, double bass
Brian Mitchell – piano, organ, accordion, keyboards

The Horn Section
Steven Bernstein – trumpet, alto horn, soprano trombone
Jay Collins – tenor saxophone
Earl McIntyre – trombone
Howard Johnson – tuba, baritone saxophone
Erik Lawrence – soprano and alto saxophone

Special guests
Roger Waters, Garth Hudson, My Morning Jacket, John Mayer, Joe Walsh, Dierks Bentley, Eric Church, Gregg Allman, Bruce Hornsby, Ray LaMontagne, John Hiatt, Grace Potter, Warren Haynes, Lucinda Williams, Mavis Staples, Allen Toussaint, David Bromberg, Robert Randolph, John Prine, Jorma Kaukonen, Marc Cohn, Jakob Dylan, Mike Gordon, Joan Osborne, Jai Johanny Johanson, Jon Randall, Matt Burr, Barry Mitterhoff, Jessi Alexander, Steve Jordan, Shawn Pelton, Rami Jaffee and G.E. Smith

Setlist
The set list was composed primarily of songs by The Band and Levon Helm solo (including songs they covered or recorded on with another artist).

"The Shape I'm In"
feat. Warren Haynes and Rami Jaffee
"Long Black Veil"
feat. Gregg Allman and Warren Haynes
"Trouble in Mind"
feat. Jorma Kaukonen, Barry Mitterhoff and Jai Johanny Johanson
"This Wheel's on Fire"
feat. Shawn Pelton
"Little Birds"
feat. Byron Isaacs and Teresa Williams
"Listening to Levon"
feat. Marc Cohn and Greg Leisz
"Move Along Train"
feat. Mavis Staples
"Life is a Carnival"
feat. Allen Toussaint and Jai Johanny Johanson
"When I Paint My Masterpiece"
feat. Garth Hudson, John Prine and Joan Osborne
"Anna Lee"
feat Bruce Hornsby
"Ain't Got No Home"
feat. Jakob Dylan and Rami Jaffee
"Whispering Pines"
feat. Lucinda Williams and Rami Jaffee
"Rag Mama Rag"
feat. John Hiatt and Mike Gordon 
Intermission 
"Don't Do It"
feat. David Bromberg and Joan Osborne
"I Shall Be Released"
feat. Grace Potter and Matt Burr
"Tears of Rage"
feat. John Mayer, Steve Jordan and Ray LaMontagne
"Rockin' Chair"
feat. Dierks Bentley, Jon Randall and Jessi Alexander
"Chest Fever"
feat. Garth Hudson, Dierks Bentley, Jon Randall and Jessi Alexander
"A Train Robbery"
feat. Eric Church
"Get Up Jake"
feat. Eric Church
"Tennessee Jed"
feat. John Mayer and Steve Jordan
"Up on Cripple Creek"
feat. Joe Walsh and Robert Randolph
"Ophelia"
feat. My Morning Jacket
"It Makes No Difference"
feat. My Morning Jacket
"The Night They Drove Old Dixie Down"
feat. Roger Waters, G.E. Smith and My Morning Jacket
"Wide River to Cross"
feat. Roger Waters and G.E. Smith
"The Weight"
feat. all guest musicians

References

External links
Love for Levon website

Tribute concerts in the United States
2012 in music
Levon Helm
2012 in New Jersey
Benefit concerts in the United States
October 2012 events in the United States